Sex Is Law, is the third studio album by Bronx, New York City rapper Father MC. It was released on June 15, 1993 by Uptown.

Track listing
 69 - 4:25
 R&B Swinger - 3:25
 Sex Is Law - 4:51
 Once She Gets Pumpin' - 4:20
 On And On - 3:47
 I Beeped You - 4:14
 Ain't Nuttin' But A Party - 4:21
 Now Is The Time - 4:07
 For The Brothers Who Ain't Here - 4:12
 The Wiggle - 3:48
 Something for the Radio - 4:27

Samples
"69"
"Jungle Boogie" by Kool and the Gang
"Who Is He and What He Is to You?" by Creative Source
"R&B Swinger"
"Hold On" by En Vogue
"Sex Is Law"
"Don't Look Any Further" by Dennis Edwards feat. Siedah Garrett
"Sex, Sex, Sex" by Nice & Smooth
"Once She Gets Pumpin'"
"Seven Minutes of Funk" by The Whole Darn Family
"Get Out of My Life, Woman" by Lee Dorsey
"Around the Way Girl" by LL Cool J
"I Beeped You"
"I Want You Back" by The Jackson 5
"Ain't Nuttin' But A Party"
"What You Won't Do for Love" by Bobby Caldwell
"Now Is The Time"
"Encore" by Cheryl Lynn
"For The Brothers Who Ain't Here"
"Sara Smile" by Hall & Oates
"Good Ole Music" by Funkadelic
"The Wiggle"
"It's A New Day" by Skull Snaps

References
http://www.discogs.com/Father-Sex-Is-Law/master/168540
http://www.allmusic.com/album/sex-is-law-mw0000622310
http://www.ew.com/ew/article/0,,308885,00.html

1993 albums
Father MC albums
Uptown Records albums